The first season of the American comedy television series Scrubs premiered on NBC on October 2, 2001 and concluded on May 21, 2002 and consists of 24 episodes. Scrubs was created by Bill Lawrence who wrote the pilot as well as 3 other episodes in the season. Adam Bernstein directed the pilot as well as 4 other episodes. Neil Flynn was only a guest star in the first season, although he appeared in every episode of the season. Bill Lawrence said if the show had been cancelled at the end of the first season, he would have made the Janitor a figment of J.D.'s imagination.

The first season follows J.D. (Zach Braff) and his best friend Turk (Donald Faison) in their first year out of medical school as interns at Sacred Heart Hospital. J.D. quickly meets his reluctant mentor, Dr. Perry Cox (John C. McGinley); a young woman (and fellow intern) named Elliot (Sarah Chalke), on whom he has a crush; the hospital's janitor (Neil Flynn), who goes out of his way to make J.D.'s life miserable; the Chief of Medicine, Dr. Bob Kelso (Ken Jenkins), who is more concerned about the budget than the patients; and Carla Espinosa (Judy Reyes), the head nurse and Turk's new girlfriend, who puts Turk through the trials and tribulations of being in a serious relationship. The characters face romances and relationship issues, family obligations, overwhelming paperwork, and a tremendous number of patients. The first season also introduces recurring supporting characters such as "The Todd" (Robert Maschio), a boorishly lascivious surgeon; Ted (Sam Lloyd), the hospital's hapless, nervous lawyer; Laverne (Aloma Wright), fellow nurse and mentor to Carla; Jordan Sullivan (Christa Miller), Dr. Cox's caustic administrator ex-wife, and Doug Murphy (Johnny Kastl), a nervous young doctor who often accidentally kills patients.

Cast and characters

Main cast
Zach Braff as Dr. John "J.D." Dorian
Sarah Chalke as Dr. Elliot Reid
Donald Faison as Dr. Chris Turk
Ken Jenkins as Dr. Bob Kelso
John C. McGinley as Dr. Perry Cox
Judy Reyes as Nurse Carla Espinosa

Recurring roles
Neil Flynn as The Janitor
Aloma Wright as Nurse Laverne Roberts
Robert Maschio as Dr. Todd Quinlan
Sam Lloyd as Ted Buckland
Charles Chun as Dr. Phillip Wen
Johnny Kastl as Dr. Doug Murphy
Christa Miller as Jordan Sullivan

Guest stars
Scott Foley as Sean Kelly
Brendan Fraser as Ben Sullivan
Michael McDonald as Mike Davis
Masi Oka as Franklyn (MT)
Sean Hayes as Nick Murdoch
DJ Qualls as Josh
John Ritter as Sam Dorian
The Blanks as the Worthless Peons

Production

Writing staff
Bill Lawrence – executive producer/head writer
Eric Weinberg – supervising producer (episodes 2–14) / co-executive producer (episodes 15–24)
Matt Tarses – consulting producer (episodes 2–14) / co-executive producer (episodes 15–24)
Neil Goldman and Garrett Donovan – co-producers
Gabrielle Allan – co-producer
Mike Schwartz – story editor
Debra Fordham – staff writer
Mark Stegemann – staff writer
Janae Bakken – staff writer

Production staff
Bill Lawrence – executive producer/showrunner
Randall Winston – producer / co-producer (pilot)
Liz Newman – associate producer
Danny Rose – associate producer
Mychelle Deschamps – producer (pilot)

Directors
Includes directors who directed 2 or more episodes
Adam Bernstein – 5 episodes (including pilot)
Michael Spiller – 4 episodes
Lawrence Trilling – 4 episodes
Marc Buckland – 4 episodes
Matthew Diamond – 2 episodes

Episodes

Notes 
† denotes a "supersized" episode, running an extended length of 25–28 minutes.

Reception
On Rotten Tomatoes, the season has an approval rating of 96% with an average score of 8.3 out of 10 based on 25 reviews. The website's critical consensus reads, "Scrubs is a worthy spiritual successor to M*A*S*H thanks in part to its seamless blend of cheeky comedy and poignant, heartfelt moments."

References

General references

External links

 
 

 
2001 American television seasons
2002 American television seasons
1